Maria of Aragon ( – ) was the Queen of Castile as the first wife of King John II from their marriage in 1420 until her death in 1445. She was the daughter of Ferdinand I of Aragon and Eleanor of Alburquerque.

Life
Maria was married by her brother in his ambition to place his father's issue on the thrones of Castile and Aragon. The marriage took place in simplicity. Maria was occasionally politically active on behalf of her brothers, the princes of Aragon; she disregarded her husband's policy in favor of her brothers and the relationship between Maria and John was somewhat tense.

After her death on 18 February 1445, her husband married Isabella of Portugal and they became the parents of Isabella I of Castile. Maria has no descendants today, her line having gone extinct within a few decades of her death.

Children
Maria and John II of Castile had four children:

Catherine, Princess of Asturias (–).
Eleanor, Princess of Asturias (–).
Henry IV of Castile (–). First married Blanche II of Navarre and later married Joan of Portugal.
Infanta Maria (–).

Ancestry

References

|-

Castilian queen consorts
Leonese queen consorts
Galician queens consort
Aragonese infantas
1396 births
1445 deaths
House of Trastámara
Burials in Extremadura
Women of medieval Spain
15th-century Spanish women
15th-century Castilians
Daughters of kings